Gerards Bridge railway station was on the St Helens to Rainford Junction then Ormskirk line immediately north of Haresfinch Road in St Helens, England. It opened on 3 February 1858 and closed on 1 August 1905. Remnants of the line through the station survive, leading to Pilkington's Cowley Hill site, though in September 2015 the tracks were out of use.

Services
The December 1895 timetable showed six "Down" trains to Rainford Junction and five "Up" to St Helens Monday-to-Friday, with an extra train in each direction on Saturdays.No trains called at Gerards Bridge on Sundays.

References

Sources

External links
 A detailed history via Disused Stations UK
 The station on an 1888-1913 Overlay OS Map via National Library of Scotland

Disused railway stations in St Helens, Merseyside
Former London and North Western Railway stations
Railway stations in Great Britain opened in 1858
Railway stations in Great Britain closed in 1905